Andresa Corrêa is a Brazilian Jiu Jitsu (BJJ) 3x black belt Brazilian Jiu Jitsu World Championship champion and 3x black belt World Nogi Brazilian Jiu-Jitsu Championship champion.  She is one of a select few athletes to have won each of the major Gi Championships on more than one occasion World Championship x3, European Open Championship x2, Pan Jiu-Jitsu Championship x2 and Brazilian Nationals Championship x4. 

Andresa had an outstanding 2016 season coming very close to winning Jiu Jitsu's "Grand Slam" of gold medals in her category and the absolute at all of the prior mentioned major Gi Championships.  She missed out narrowly by winning her category but coming third in the absolute at the 2016 World Championship.    That year she also won a gold medal in the World Nogi championship.

Andresa began training in 1996 at Mestre Carlos Rollyson's academy in Bragança Paulista.  She moved to the Alliance Jiu Jitsu academy in Sao Paulo in 2010 to train under Mestre Fabio Gurgel.

References

Brazilian practitioners of Brazilian jiu-jitsu
Living people
1980 births
People awarded a black belt in Brazilian jiu-jitsu
World No-Gi Brazilian Jiu-Jitsu Championship medalists
Female Brazilian jiu-jitsu practitioners
Sportspeople from São Paulo (state)